Michael Downing may refer to:

Michael Downing (director), Canadian film director (Clean Rite Cowboy, Why Don't You Dance?)
Michael Downing (politician), former state legislator in New Hampshire
Michael Downing (writer), American writer (Perfect Agreement, Breakfast with Scot)
Michael P. Downing, a former chief of the Los Angeles Police Department